KPSE-LD (channel 50) is a low-power television station licensed to Palm Springs, California, United States, serving the Coachella Valley as an affiliate of MyNetworkTV. It is owned by Entravision Communications (as the company's only MyNetworkTV affiliate), and is sister to NBC affiliate KMIR-TV (channel 36, also licensed to Palm Springs), Indio-licensed Univision affiliate KVER-CD (channel 41) and UniMás affiliate KEVC-CD (channel 5). KPSE and KMIR share studios on Parkview Drive in Palm Desert; KEVC and KVER maintain separate facilities on Corporate Way, also in Palm Desert. KPSE's transmitter is located atop Edom Hill in Cathedral City.

History

The station signed on January 3, 2000 as KPSE-LP on channel 50, the market's first locally based UPN affiliate. Owned by Mirage Media, it immediately replaced Los Angeles' KCOP-TV on Coachella Valley's Time Warner Cable system; until KPSE's launch, KCOP had served as UPN's de facto affiliate for Palm Springs. After UPN and The WB shut down and merged in 2006 to form The CW (which affiliated with KCWQ-LP and a subchannel of ABC affiliate KESQ-TV), KPSE joined MyNetworkTV.

On September 26, 2007, Journal Communications (owner of KMIR) announced its purchase of KPSE from Mirage Media for $4.7 million with the transaction receiving approval January 28, 2008. In October 2013, Journal reached a deal to sell KMIR and KPSE to OTA Broadcasting, LLC (a company controlled by Michael Dell's MSD Capital). The sale was completed January 1, 2014

Along with other major Coachella Valley stations, KPSE-LP formerly identified itself on-air using its cable designation (at that time, channel 13) rather than its over-the-air analog channel position. This unusual practice (also common in the Fort Myers–Naples, Florida market) stems in part from Palm Springs's exceptionally high cable penetration rate of 80.5% which is one of the highest in the United States. The station now brands simply as "KPSE My TV."

Until recently, the station offered programming from TheCoolTV in a secondary arrangement. That network could be seen weekday mornings from 6 until 9, Saturday mornings from 5 to noon, and Sundays from noon until 2:30.

On September 22, 2011, Journal was granted a construction permit for a new low-power digital station on channel 29, which was immediately issued the call sign K29KF-D. On September 3, 2014, OTA Broadcasting changed K29KF-D's call letters to KPSG-LD and applied for a license to cover the permit; a week later, channel 29 became KPSE-LD, while KPSE-LP on channel 50 took the KPSG-LP call sign. On May 26, 2015, the KPSG-LP license was canceled.

On July 21, 2017, it was announced that Spanish-language broadcaster Entravision Communications (minority owned by Univision Communications) was acquiring KPSE and KMIR-TV for $21 million. The sale to Entravision will make both stations a sister stations to KEVC-CD, KVER-CD and KVES-LD. The transaction was completed on November 1.

2013 Time Warner Cable compensation dispute
Due to its low-power status, the station was pulled from Time Warner Cable systems at midnight on July 11, 2013 in a retransmission consent dispute with Time Warner; KMIR continued to air on the system due to rules disallowing full-power stations from being pulled during a sweeps period. KMIR, along with all Journal stations, was pulled at midnight on July 25, 2013 off Time Warner systems at the end of the sweeps period. On September 20, 2013, a deal was reached to return Journal's stations, including KMIR and KPSE, to Time Warner Cable; as part of the deal, KPSE moved to channel 20, ceding its former channel 13 slot to KMIR (which lost its longtime channel 6 position to Game Show Network).

Programming

Syndicated programming
Syndicated programming on KPSE-LD includes The People's Court, Judge Judy, Access Hollywood, Two and a Half Men, and Modern Family, among others.

Newscasts
Sister station KMIR produces three local news broadcasts for KPSE-LD. This includes a two-hour extension of the NBC affiliate's weekday morning show. Known as KMIR News Today on KPSE My TV, the program can be seen from 7 to 9 a.m. offering a local alternative to Today. There is a nightly prime time newscast called KMIR News at 10:00 on KPSE My TV that runs for 30 minutes. All KPSE-LD broadcasts compete with local news seen on Class A Fox affiliate KDFX-CD that is produced by rival KESQ and KPSP.

Subchannels
The station's digital signal is multiplexed:

See also
Channel 13 branded TV stations in the United States
Channel 29 digital TV stations in the United States
Channel 29 low-power TV stations in the United States
Channel 50 virtual TV stations in the United States

References

External links

Television channels and stations established in 2000
2000 establishments in California
PSE-LD
MyNetworkTV affiliates
Grit (TV network) affiliates
Bounce TV affiliates
Court TV affiliates
Low-power television stations in the United States